Eric Girard is a Canadian politician, who was elected to the National Assembly of Quebec in the 2018 provincial election. He represents the electoral district of Groulx as a member of the Coalition Avenir Québec and is the current Minister of Finance.

He worked as a senior manager with the National Bank of Canada for over 20 years.

Girard was recruited as a star candidate to run for the Conservative Party of Canada in the Montreal riding of Lac-Saint-Louis for the 2015 federal election. He finished a distant second to Liberal incumbent Francis Scarpaleggia.

In 2018, he was elected as the Coalition Avenir Québec MNA in the suburban Montreal riding of Groulx.

Electoral record

Federal
Lac-Saint-Louis

Provincial
Groulx

Cabinet posts

References

1966 births
Living people
Coalition Avenir Québec MNAs
Finance ministers of Quebec
Members of the Executive Council of Quebec
21st-century Canadian politicians
People from Laurentides
People from Sept-Îles, Quebec
Conservative Party of Canada candidates for the Canadian House of Commons